RoundGlass Foundation is an Indian NGO working mainly in Punjab, India. The organization is headed by Vishal Chowla who was earlier CEO for Resource Mobilization & External Engagement at Save the Children India, and headed Direct Impact Team at GiveIndia. Their subsidiary company Roundglass Sports Pvt Ltd owns RoundGlass Punjab FC.

Initiatives

Covid-19 relief 
RoundGlass Foundation started an initiative in April 2020 to distribute food ration to families in 400+ villages of Punjab during the COVID-19 pandemic lockdown. As of 8 April 2020, food ration was distributed to 457 households in 18 villages of Punjab, India.

Heart circles 
Amidst the covid-19 lockdown, the foundation ran a project named Heart Circles in which volunteers reached out to school children by collaborating with schools in various districts of Punjab, India and gave them tasks and challenges to keep them engaged. Thus, giving the children an opportunity to share their feelings. Another part of the challenge contained challenges around STEM, Fitness and Acts of Kindness.

Self organized learning environment 
In August 2019, the foundation created self organized learning environment labs in 20 villages in Moga district.

References

External links 

 

Organisations based in Punjab, India
2010 establishments in Punjab, India
Organizations established in 2010